Goppinti Alludu is a 2000 Telugu-language comedy film, produced by Nandamuri Rama Krishna on Ramakrishna Horticulture Cine Studios banner and directed by E. V. V. Satyanarayana. The film stars Nandamuri Balakrishna, Simran, Sanghavi, Sadhika, and music composed by Koti. It is a remake of the Hindi film Hero No. 1 (1997). The film was released on 21 July 2000.

Plot
The film begins in a multi-millionaire Achyuta Ramayya's family resides his 3 daughters, their wayward husbands, and Sowya & Jalandhara the two daughters of his deceased son. In that house, no one likes each other and it runs always between quarrels. As a result, no man advances to work therein. Apart from that, Sowya is demeaned by the entire family except for Achyuta Ramayya as she is the illicit progeny of her father. Jalandhara showers fake affection but internally envies and enemies her. Besides, Murali Manohar is the son of a tycoon SVR who returns from abroad after completing graduation. SVR aspires to knit his son into a conjoined joint family. Since he & his wife nuptial a love marriage like this they alienate everyone. Therefore, he fixes an alliance with Jiddu Balamani the daughter of Jiddu Bharadwaja. To get rid of it, Murali absconds back to Switzerland. In parallel, Sowmya gets a job offer in the same spot and she proceeds. Currently, the two are acquainted in the airport and continue the flight journey with consistent mocks. 

In the interim, SVR hurried rushes to the airport when circumstantially he clashes with Achyuta Ramayya. Shortly, Murali & Sowmya land in Switzerland where nobody shows up to receive Sowmya because of Jalandhara's ruse, she is forced to stay overnight with Murali. Following, Sowmya approaches her office exiting from Murali where her boss Paramahamsa tries to molest her. Anyhow, she is secured by Murali, puts Paramahamsa behind bars. During this, Murali & Sowmya falls in love. SVR also arrives in search of his son who learns about Sowmya's family and accepts the match. Soon after they get back, Sowmya reveals her intention to Achyuta Rammayya which he happily agrees but Jalandhara infuriates by it. Before long, SVR moves to Achyuta Ramayya's house. On the way due to some unforeseen accident, SVR runs Achuta Ramayya down with his car and fractures his legs. Exploiting it, Jalandhara exaggerates the situation and makes the family mortify, and boot SVR. Being cognizant of it, Murali enrages when SVR calms him and takes a promise to splice Sowmya with the consent of her family.     

Presently, Murali joins as a cook Bheemudu in Achyuta Ramayya's house and acquires everyone's credence. Step by step, he changes their attitudes, aids in the troubles, and develops warmth among the family members. Jalandhara identifies him, attempts to lure whom he turns down, and challenges her to wedlock Sowmya. After a few comic scenes, Jalandhara exposes the reality when Achyuta Ramayya again affronts and necks them. At that point, the entire family stands on behalf of Murali & Sowmya as reformed and also convinces Achyuta Ramayya who apologizes to SVR. Now the wedding arrangements carry on with the complete family's participation. Thus, Jalandhara comes out with her demonic shade and plots to kill Sowmya when she itself safeguarded by Murali at the request of Sowmya. At last, she transforms after soul-searching. Finally, the movie ends on a happy note with the marriage of Murali Manohar & Sowmya.

Cast

 Nandamuri Balakrishna as Murali Manohar / Bheemudu
 Simran as Sowmya
 Sanghavi as Jalandhara
 Sadhika as Jiddu Balamani
 Satyanarayana as Achyutha Rammaiah
 SP Balasubramanyam as SVR
 Kota Srinivasa Rao as Jiddu Bharadwaja
 Tanikella Bharani as Achyutha Rammaiha's elder son-in-law
 Chalapathi Rao as Subba Rao
 Jaya Prakash Reddy as Swamy Naidu
 Babloo Prithviraj as Paramahamsa
 Surya as Achyutha Rammaiha's third son-in-law
 Ahuti Prasad as Achyutha Rammaiha's second son-in-law
 Mallikarjuna Rao as Pandu, a cook
 L.B. Sriram as Servant
 Gundu Hanumantha Rao 
 Sudha as Achyutha Rammaiha's elder daughter
 Shanoor Sana as Achyutha Rammaiha's second daughter
 Hema as Achyutha Rammaiha's third daughter
 Madhumani as Widow
 Kalpana Rai as Servant

Soundtrack
Music composed by Koti.

Reception
Jeevi  from Idlebrain.com gave a three-star rating and commented, "EVV exploited and played with the unexposed comic timing of Balayya in this film. He has done a wonderful job". Another critic commended the film saying, "Goppinti Alludu is a laugh riot all through, you'll enjoy it."

References

External links
 

2000 films
2000s Telugu-language films
Indian comedy-drama films
Films directed by E. V. V. Satyanarayana
Films scored by Koti
Telugu remakes of Hindi films
2000 comedy-drama films